Nicola Campedelli (born 7 February 1979) is an Italian football coach and former player who coaches Serie D club ASD Savignanese.

Playing career
A midfielder, Campedelli played with Cesena from 1997 to 2000.

In 2007, when at Cesena, he suffered a Lisfranc fracture which he never fully recovered from, making only a handful in the 2007–08 Serie B season, forcing him to announce his retirement from football in June 2009. Nicola is a brother of Cesena president Igor, which Cesena bought Nicola from Modena for €650,000 in co-ownership deal in 5-year contract. In June 2009 Modena gave up the remain 50% registration rights, as Nicola retired at the end of season.

Coaching career
For the 2009–10 season, Campedelli was coach of Cesenatico promoted to Serie D. He took the UEFA B License course from 20 July to 6 August 2009.

In the two next seasons he has been the coach of Bellaria in Lega Pro Seconda Divisione saved for all two seasons. He obtained the necessary coaching license for that level (UEFA A License) in June 2011.

Campedelli was hired by Cesena on 25 May 2012, just weeks after the club relegated to Serie B as caretaker. FIGC gave special permission to him despite not a holder of UEFA Pro License. He was sacked on 10 September after three Serie B matches, from his brother Igor, the president of club  and replaced by Pierpaolo Bisoli. Campedelli obtained the Pro License in July 2013.

References

External links
Profile at Football.it
FIGC

1979 births
Living people
Italian footballers
Italy under-21 international footballers
Italy youth international footballers
A.C. Cesena players
U.S. Salernitana 1919 players
Modena F.C. players
Serie A players
Association football midfielders
A.C. Cesena managers
People from Cesena
Italian football managers
Footballers from Emilia-Romagna
Sportspeople from the Province of Forlì-Cesena